The Hanover War Cemetery (locally known as the Limmer War Cemetery,) is a military cemetery owned by the Commonwealth War Graves Commission (CWGC). The cemetery is immediately adjacent to the city of Hannover, and is more precisely located in the city of Seelze.

History and availability
In the early 1950s, the cemetery was first built. The main intention of the cemetery was to be a cemetery for Commonwealth soldiers who were killed during World War II, and to merge all of the other cemeteries with the same purpose into one. Upon the completion of the cemetery, 2,451 soldiers, mainly from the Air Force, were buried. However, there are currently only 2,345 burials.

Cemetery design
The CWGC's planning and landscape provisions were applied in the final structure of this cemetery. Thus, the visual axis forms with the "Stone of Remembrance" (altar stone) and the inscription "Their Name Liveth For Evermore" and the "Cross of Sacrifice" (Cross of Sacrifice) to the issued Greatsword, the central axis of the cemetery. The gravestones of sandstone are aligned with the visual axis, and contain the name, rank, date of death, and the coat of arms of its holder's unit. The graves aren't arranged by ranks or origin, symbolizing the cemetery's support in equality in death. Upon entering the cemetery, there is a lawn and shrubs which gives the visitor a view into the cemetery grounds. The cemetery is one of those designed by Commission architect Philip Hepworth.

References

External links 

Cemeteries in Germany
Commonwealth War Graves Commission cemeteries in Germany